Federal Medical Centre, Ido Ekiti is a federal government of Nigeria medical centre located in Ido Ekiti, Ekiti State, Nigeria. The current chief medical director is Adekunle Ajayi.

History 
Federal Medical Centre, Ido Ekiti was established in 1998. The hospital was formerly known as General Hospital, Ido Ekiti.

CMD 
The current chief medical director is Adekunle Ajayi.

References 

Hospitals in Nigeria